An electrical code is a set of regulations for the design and installation of electrical wiring in a building.  
The intention of a code is to provide standards to ensure electrical wiring systems that are safe for people and property.   

Such wiring is subject to rigorous safety standards for design and installation. Wires and electrical cables are specified according to the circuit operating voltage and electric current capability, with further restrictions on the environmental conditions, such as ambient temperature range, moisture levels, and exposure to sunlight and chemicals. Associated circuit protection, control and distribution devices within a building's wiring system are subject to voltage, current and functional specification. To ensure both wiring and associated devices are designed, selected and installed so that they are safe for use, they are subject to wiring safety codes or regulations, which vary by locality, country or region. 

The International Electrotechnical Commission (IEC) is attempting to harmonise wiring standards amongst member countries, but large variations in design and installation requirements still exist.

List of electrical codes
 National Electrical Code has been adopted for electrical wiring in the United States and for Mexico, Costa Rica, Venezuela and Colombia
 IEC 60364 is used as a basis for electrical codes in many European countries
 Canadian Electrical Code published by the CSA is used in Canada (see Electrical wiring in North America).
 British Standard BS 7671 is the set of regulations for electrical wiring in the United Kingdom.
 Australian/New Zealand Standard AS/NZS 3000:2007 Wiring Rules is used in Australia and New Zealand.
 NF C 15-100 (fr) is used for low voltage installations in France
 RGIE (fr) (Réglement Général sur les Installations Électriques) is used for installations in Belgium.
 AREI (nl) (Algemeen Reglement Elektrische Installaties) is used for installations in Flanders, Belgium.

See also 
 Electrical wiring

Electrical safety
Fire protection
Fire prevention